Stronger Than Ever is the second EP of hardcore band Raised Fist.

Track listing

Stronger Than Ever
Reduction of Hate
Torn Apart
I’ve Tried
Next
The Answer
Time for Changes
Soldiers of Today
E-skile

Musicians

 Marco Eronen - Guitar
 Peter Karlsson – drums
 Andreas "Josse" Johansson - Bass
 Alexander "Alle" Hagman - Vocals

Raised Fist albums
1996 EPs
Burning Heart Records EPs